The 2000 AAA Championships was an outdoor track and field competition organised by the Amateur Athletic Association (AAA), held from 11–13 July at Alexander Stadium in Birmingham, England. It was considered the de facto national championships for the United Kingdom.

The competition acted as the trials event for selection for Great Britain at the 2000 Summer Olympics.

Medal summary

Men

Women

References

AAA Championships
AAA Championships
Athletics Outdoor
AAA Championships
Sports competitions in Birmingham, West Midlands
Athletics competitions in England
Olympics trials